Pink trumpet tree is a common name for several plants and may refer to:

Handroanthus impetiginosus, native to Central and South America
Tabebuia heterophylla, native to the Caribbean